Franz Harress (died circa 1915) was a mathematician and contemporary of Albert Einstein and is best known for his experiment on the propagation of light in a rotating glass device. This experiment sparked an argument between Albert Einstein and Paul Harzer related to the theory of Special Relativity.
Harress was a student of Professor Otto Julius Heinrich Knopf at Friedrich-Schiller-Universität Jena in 1912. His dissertation was "Die Geschwindigkeit des Lichtes in bewegten Körpern" ("The speed of light in moving bodies"). His work on the Sagnac effect was analyzed by Max von Laue in his 1920 paper "On the Experiment of F. Harress."

References

Year of birth missing
1915 deaths
20th-century German mathematicians
Place of birth missing
University of Jena alumni
Nationality missing
Mathematical physicists